The crescentchests are a genus, Melanopareia, of suboscine passerine birds from South America. The genus has long been placed with the tapaculos in the family Rhinocryptidae. Their placement there has been questioned and in 2007 the genus was placed in its own family, Melanopareiidae, by the South American Classification Committee. Subsequently, the family was accepted by the International Ornithological Congress Bird List and the Clements Checklist. The family Melanopareiidae was formally erected in 2009.

The plumage is striking with a distinctive band across the chest that gives the group their name.

The crescentchests are birds of arid scrub. They generally forage on the ground, but their diet has not yet been recorded. Two species, the collared crescentchest and olive-crowned crescentchest, are widely distributed across central and southern Brazil, Bolivia, Paraguay and northern Argentina. The double-collared crescentchest, which was recently split from the collared crescentchest, is found in eastern Bolivia, whilst the other two species, the elegant crescentchest and Marañón crescentchest, have a more restricted distribution in Peru and Ecuador.

Little is known about the behaviour of the crescentchests. The only species about which anything is known about the breeding behaviour is the olive-crowned crescentchest. That species is a seasonal breeder. The nest of that species is a 15 cm high cup made of vegetable fibres and palm fronds, hidden in grasses or low shrubs close to the ground. The clutch size is two to three eggs, the eggs are white with blotches or black spots.

No species of crescentchest is considered by the IUCN to be threatened by human activities, but the Marañón crescentchest is listed as near threatened. Although the species is apparently tolerant of some disturbance it has a tiny global range and is uncommon even within that range.

Species
The genus contains the following five species:

References

External links

Crescentchests Don Roberson's Bird Families of the World.

Melanopareia
Taxa named by Ludwig Reichenbach
Taxonomy articles created by Polbot
Taxa described in 1853